Oestodinae is a subfamily of click beetles in the family Elateridae. There are at least two genera in Oestodinae.

Genera
These two genera belong to the subfamily Oestodinae:
 Bladus Leconte, 1861
 Oestodes Leconte, 1853

References

Further reading

 

Elateridae